The Macedonian Catholic Eparchy of the Assumption of the Blessed Virgin Mary in Strumica-Skopje is the only eparchy of the Macedonian Greek Catholic Church. It is situated in North Macedonia. The eparchy is an Immediately subject to the Holy See.

History
January 11, 2001: Established as Apostolic Exarchate of Macedonia for the Macedonians from the Greek Catholic Eparchy of Križevci.
May 31, 2018: Elevated in the rank of an eparchy (diocese) as the Macedonian Catholic Eparchy of the Assumption of the Blessed Virgin Mary in Strumica-Skopje.

Eparchial bishops
The following is a list of the Apostolic Exarchs and the Eparchial Bishops of the eparchy and their terms of service:
 11 January 2001 – 15 April 2005: Joakim Herbut, Bishop of Skopje
 since 20 July 2005: Kiro Stojanov, Bishop of Skopje

See also
 Catholic Church in North Macedonia
 Bulgarian Greek Catholic Church
 Greek Catholic Church of Croatia and Serbia
 Albanian Greek Catholic Church
 Greek Byzantine Catholic Church

References

External links
Official website
GCatholic.org information on the eparchy
Profile at the Catholic Hierarchy
Official website 

Roman Catholic dioceses and prelatures established in the 21st century
Christian organizations established in 2001
Macedonian Greek Catholic Church